The Punisher or Original Score from the Motion Picture The Punisher is the official score for the film The Punisher and was released in 2004. It was entirely composed by Carlo Siliotto. The score has an Italian and western influence and theme.

Track list

Production

The score was composed and conducted by composer Carlo Siliotto, who is Italian like most of the characters, including the main character Frank Castle. Wishing the music to be especially emotive, and being made aware of Siliotto's previous work, such as on the film Flight of the Innocent and the miniseries Julius Caesar by Siliottos agent, Tammy Krutchkoff trought Marvels music supervisor, Dave Jordan, director Jonathan Hensleigh approached them, saying that he wanted Siliotto for the job. When working on the film he viewed Frank Castle as a tragic character and stated:

Originally Siliotto thought that it was unusual for an action movie director to want to use an Italian musician for his project and stated that the entire work process was stress free due to Hensleigh being a fan of his work.

Before the film's release, two tracks were already available at the film's website.

Reception
Mike Blanchard of Geekcastradio gave the score mixed review, stating that the music did not immediately grip him but that the main theme is very strong.

Mark Wallance of Film Score Monthly praised the score highly and expressed that it was the first time in a long time that he had seen a film that was worth watching just for the music. He added that he hoped that the films would inspire other films to put more effort into the score. Wallance also commended Siliotto for composing it in its entirety by himself.

References

External links
 IMDB, short docdocumentary, further information

2004 soundtrack albums
2000s film soundtrack albums
Action film soundtracks
Carlo Siliotto soundtracks
La-La Land Records soundtracks
Punisher in music
The Punisher (2004 film)